Lambton Le Breton Mount (12 March 1836 – 12 June 1931) was a Canadian-born Australian businessman. He is credited with introducing the sport of lacrosse to Australia.

In 1853, Mount emigrated from Canada to Victoria, Australia with other family members. During the early 1860s, he was a well-known athlete, running against H. C. A. Harrison in a series of foot races. In 1866, with his brother Frank and the poet Adam Lindsay Gordon, Mount migrated to Western Australia, where they were business partners in an unsuccessful sheep farm at Balingup. The Mounts were also early settlers in the north west Western Australia and held a pastoral lease on the De Grey River, between 1866 and 1868. They then returned to Victoria.

Mount imported forty lacrosse sticks in 1876, an initiative that led to the first match of lacrosse held in Australia, at Albert Park. The sport grew quickly and within two years, the Victorian Lacrosse Association had 120 members.

In his later years, Mount was prominent as a manufacturer of glass bottles in Melbourne.  He became president of the Victorian Chamber of Manufacturers and was on the Commission for the Centennial International Exhibition in 1888.

See also

Lacrosse
History of Lacrosse
Lacrosse in Australia
:Category:Australian lacrosse players

References

Australian lacrosse players
Canadian emigrants to Australia
1836 births
1931 deaths